FM is an American television sitcom which aired on NBC in 1989 and 1990. The series title was a pun, referring both to the show's setting at an FM radio station and to its themes of female-male interaction.

Plot

Set in Washington, D.C., the series was a workplace comedy which took place at 91.6/WGEO, a small public radio station. Robert Hays starred as program director Ted Costas, a man whose harried professional life and eccentric coworkers distract him from dealing with problems in his personal life, particularly his relationships with women. The women in his life include Lee-Ann Plunkett (Patricia Richardson), his ex-wife and a political commentator with the station; Gretchen Schreck (DeLane Matthews), a young woman he used to babysit who is now an intern for the station; Naomi Sayers (Lynne Thigpen), the station manager; and Maude (Nicole Huntington), his daughter with Lee-Ann.

The cast also included Leo Geter, Fred Applegate, James Avery and John Kassir.

The radio station in the series was partially based on KCRW. Ted Costas was modeled on Tom Schnabel, and was the host of a morning radio show, Long Day's Journey into Lunch, which was based on Morning Becomes Eclectic.

Scheduling
The show initially ran for five weeks as a summer series in 1989, premiering on August 17 in Dear Johns regular Thursday night time slot following Cheers before moving to Wednesday nights for four more weeks. It then returned as a midseason replacement in 1990, airing eight more episodes between March 28 and June 28. The series was not renewed for a second season.

Episodes

References

External links

1989 American television series debuts
1990 American television series endings
1980s American sitcoms
1980s American workplace comedy television series
1990s American sitcoms
1990s American workplace comedy television series
Television series by MTM Enterprises
NBC original programming
Television series about radio
Television shows set in Washington, D.C.